The 1979–80 season was Paris Saint-Germain's 10th season in existence. PSG played their home league games at the Parc des Princes in Paris, registering an average attendance of 21,380 spectators per match. The club was presided by Francis Borelli. The team was coached by Velibor Vasović until October 1979, when Camille Choquier took over for the remaining matches of that month. Georges Peyroche was then appointed as the new manager in November 1979. Dominique Bathenay was the team captain.

Summary

Velibor Vasović's second stint in Paris got off to a promising start in 1979–80. PSG signed Portuguese maestro João Alves and recorded their best debut to a league campaign since 1974, picking up a draw away to Lyon and a home win over Marseille in their first two matches. But the club's fortunes soon turned sour. A week after his stellar performance against Marseille, Alves suffered a near career-ending injury at Sochaux in August 1979, which sidelined him for five months. Alves returned at the start of 1980 but never fully recovered his previous form.

Then, PSG lost their manager in early October 1979. Vasović was forced to resign following pressure from coach union UNECATEF and its president Guy Roux because he did not have the official diplomas to coach in France. Former PSG goalkeeper Camille Choquier took over until the end of the month. He managed three matches, winning two and losing one, before Georges Peyroche arrived to the French capital in November 1979. Against all odds, Peyroche excelled and led PSG to a 7th-place finish, the club's best ever league ranking at the time.

Players 

As of the 1979–80 season.

Squad

Out on loan

Transfers 

As of the 1979–80 season.

Arrivals

Departures

Kits 

French radio RTL was the shirt sponsor. French sportswear brand Le Coq Sportif was the kit manufacturer.

Friendly tournaments

Tournoi de Libreville

Tournoi de Paris

Competitions

Overview

Division 1

League table

Results by round

Matches

Coupe de France

Round of 64

Round of 32

Statistics 

As of the 1979–80 season.

Appearances and goals 

|-
!colspan="16" style="background:#dcdcdc; text-align:center"|Goalkeepers

|-
!colspan="16" style="background:#dcdcdc; text-align:center"|Defenders

|-
!colspan="16" style="background:#dcdcdc; text-align:center"|Midfielders

|-
!colspan="16" style="background:#dcdcdc; text-align:center"|Forwards

|-

References

External links 

Official websites
 PSG.FR - Site officiel du Paris Saint-Germain
 Paris Saint-Germain - Ligue 1 
 Paris Saint-Germain - UEFA.com

Paris Saint-Germain F.C. seasons
Association football clubs 1979–80 season
French football clubs 1979–80 season